The 643rd Tank Destroyer Battalion was a tank destroyer battalion of the United States Army active during the Second World War.

The battalion was activated at Camp Blanding on 15 December 1941, in line with the reorganisation of the anti-tank force, by redesignating the Provisional Antitank Battalion of the 43rd Infantry Division. It was later organized as a towed battalion, equipped with towed 3" anti-tank guns.

The 643rd deployed into Normandy exactly three years after it was activated, landing at Cherbourg on 15 December 1944. The following day, a major German offensive was launched in the Ardennes forest, beginning the Battle of the Bulge, and the battalion was rushed into action, arriving at the front on 22 December. One company was deployed that same evening to support an attack on Hotton by elements of Combat Command Reserve of the 3rd Armored Division. The battalion remained attached to the 3rd Armoured until 26 December, supporting it in a number of small-scale engagements.

The battalion was later briefly attached to the 82nd Airborne Division before being assigned to the 83rd Infantry Division on 2 February; it would serve with them for the remainder of the war After being re-equipped with M18 Hellcat tank destroyers in March, it pushed into central Germany with the 83rd, crossing the Elbe river before being withdrawn to take up occupation duties in the Harz Mountains at the end of the war.

Notes

References

 
 Tankdestroyer.net (Web based United States tank destroyer forces information resource) Tankdestroyer.net

Tank destroyer battalions of the United States Army
Military units and formations disestablished in 1945
Military units and formations established in 1941